Multiplayer online battle arena (MOBA) is a subgenre of strategy video games in which two teams of players compete against each other on a predefined battlefield. Each player controls a single character with a set of distinctive abilities that improve over the course of a game and which contribute to the team's overall strategy. The typical ultimate objective is for each team to destroy their opponents' main structure, located at the opposite corner of the battlefield. In some MOBA games, the objective can be defeating every player on the enemy team. Players are assisted by computer-controlled units that periodically spawn in groups and march forward along set paths toward their enemy's base, which is heavily guarded by defensive structures. This type of multiplayer online video games originated as a subgenre of real-time strategy, though MOBA players usually do not construct buildings or units. Moreover, there are examples of MOBA games that are not considered real-time strategy games, such as Smite (2014), and Paragon. The genre is seen as a fusion of real-time strategy, role-playing and action games.

The first widely accepted game in the genre was Aeon of Strife (AoS), a fan-made custom map for StarCraft in which four players each control a single powerful unit and, aided by weak computer-controlled units, compete against a stronger computer. Defense of the Ancients (DotA) was created in 2003 by the Warcraft III modding community for Warcraft III: Reign of Chaos and its expansion, The Frozen Throne, with a map based on AoS. DotA was one of the first major titles of its genre and the first MOBA for which sponsored tournaments were held. It was followed by two spiritual successors, League of Legends (2009) and Heroes of Newerth (2010), as well by a standalone sequel, Dota 2 (2013), and numerous other games in the genre, such as Heroes of the Storm (2015).

By the early 2010s, the genre had become a big part of the esports category. In 2018, prize pools reached over US$60 million, 40% of the year's total esports prize pools. Major esports professional tournaments are held in venues that can hold tens of thousands of spectators and are streamed online. A strong fanbase has opened up the opportunity for sponsorship and advertising, eventually leading the genre to become a global cultural phenomenon. For example, 2018 League of Legends World Championship had the biggest prize pool out of all League of Legends esports championship finals, awarding almost $6.5 million.

Gameplay 

Each match starts with two opposing teams typically composed of five players. Players work together as a team to achieve the ultimate victory condition, which is to destroy their enemy's base whilst protecting their own. Usually, both teams have main structures, located at the opposite corners of the battlefield. The first team to destroy the opponents' main structure wins the match, though some games have the option of different victory conditions. Destroying other structures within the opposing team's base may confer other benefits. Defensive structures, which are usually automatic "towers", are in place to prevent this. Each team is assisted by relatively weak computer-controlled units, called "minions", that periodically spawn in groups at both bases, marching down predefined paths (called "lanes") toward their enemy base. While their charges are counterbalanced by the opposite team's minions, players can aid them which turns the minions into a useful army for striking the opponents' defenses. There are typically three "lanes" on the battlefield that are the main ways of getting from one base to another. The lanes are known as top, middle and bottom lane, or, in gamer shorthand – "top", "mid" and "bot". Between the lanes is an uncharted area called "jungle". The "jungle" is a residence to neutral monsters that are hostile to both teams and appear in marked locations on the map known as "camps". Defeating neutral monsters brings various benefits to the players and their team, such as growth in power, buffs, or assistance in pushing the lane.

The games are usually played on a battlefield shown from an isometric perspective, though MOBA design DotA popularized also made its way into games that deviated from the mod's isometric view, such as third-person shooters and side-scrolling platformers. The battlefield is represented in the interface by the mini-map.

A player controls a single powerful in-game unit, called a "hero" or "champion", with each utilizing a unique set of abilities and style of play. When a hero stands near a killed enemy unit or kills an enemy unit, they gain experience points and gold which allow the hero to level up and buy items at a store. When a hero levels up, they grow in power and may strengthen one of their abilities which they typically have four of. If a hero runs out of health points and consequently dies, they are removed from active play until a respawn timer counts down to zero, at which point the hero respawns in their base. The amount of time required to respawn generally increases as the game progresses and/or the players level up.

Heroes typically fall into one of several roles, such as tank, damage dealer, and support, each of which having unique designs, strengths, and weaknesses. MOBAs typically offer a large number of viable playable heroes for the player to choose from – League of Legends, for instance, began with 40, and has continued to add characters over the game's lifespan, reaching 100 in 2012 and 150 in 2020. This adds to the overall complexity of the game as players must be aware of an ever-increasing list of available characters. Choosing the correct character to play is itself a skill in the MOBA genre, as players must weigh the available options to decide which character best suits their skill set, teammates, and opponents. Players usually find at least one hero they excel at playing, often referred to as a "main", and familiarize themselves with the remaining roster. Additionally, each hero is deliberately limited in the roles they can fulfill. No single hero is supposed to be powerful enough to win the game without support from their team. This creates a strong emphasis on teamwork and cooperation. The genre rewards players that are capable of cooperating with their teammates to execute an effective strategy, enabling full potential of their individual abilities and mechanical skills.

Each player typically receives a small amount of gold per second during the course of the game. Moderate amounts of gold are rewarded for killing hostile computer-controlled units and larger amounts are rewarded for killing enemy heroes. Gold is used by heroes to buy a variety of different items that range in price and impact. For the most part, this involves improving the combat viability of the hero, although there may be other items that support the hero or team as a whole in different ways. As the heroes of each team get stronger, they can use multiple strategies to gain an advantage. These strategies can include securing objectives, killing enemy heroes and gaining levels by killing computer-controlled units. The stronger a team gets, the more capable they are at destroying the enemy team and their base, as well as protecting their own.

Character classes and roles 
In most MOBAs, playable characters have assigned classes such as "tank", "bruiser", "marksman", "mage", "fighter", "assassin", "support" and "healer", with each classification denoting various different skill sets and proficiencies. During the match, characters can be played in roles such as "carry", "support" and "ganker"; however, the number and type of roles can differ depending on the game. The carry role is expected to scale and itemize themselves to do the most damage against enemy characters and objectives, but may also require protection and assistance from their team members. Supports assist their team with abilities that aid allies and disable enemies, rather than dealing damage directly. Some supports have healing abilities which can be vital factor in the team composition's success, giving health and sustenance to their allies while limiting the enemy's options in terms of play patterns. Ganker roles are flexible, as they have both carry and support skills that are used to disrupt and eliminate enemies, thus giving their teammates an advantage over their opponents. Gankers can "act as a strategist, decision-maker or supporter depending on the team's needs." Player roles can be classified by the particular lane they are focusing on, such as "top laner", "mid laner", and "bottom laner", or by their role in a teamfight, such as "frontliner", "damage dealer", "healer", "flex", and the "offlaner".

Resemblance to other genres 

As a fusion of real-time strategy (RTS), role-playing, and action games, MOBAs have many elements of preexisting genres while still offering unique gameplay. In general, the design philosophy of the MOBA genre has moved away from constructing structures, army building, and controlling additional units in favor of hero-centric gameplay. However, some MOBA games have certain heroes which control a few specialized units, but not on a massive scale commonly found in RTS games. As is the case in real-time strategy games, structures and base defense are important, and destroying the main structure at the heart of the enemy base typically serves as the ultimate victory condition of a given match. Players can find various friendly and enemy units on the map at any given time assisting each team, however, these units are computer-controlled and players usually do not have direct control over their movement and creation; instead, they forward along the map's lanes. 

Many defining elements of the action genre are represented in MOBA games. Players with better mechanical skills and quick reaction times typically excel relative to their peers. MOBAs often have a strong focus on micromanagement, involving mechanical abilities such as positioning, dodging, use of combo attacks, kiting, prediction and target selection. Direction-targeted abilities, or "skillshots", require precise aim and good timing in order to hit an enemy.

The MOBA genre resembles role-playing games (RPGs) in gameplay, though the MOBA genre focuses on the multiplayer battle in the arena-like environment, whereas RPGs typically revolve around a single-player story and exploration of different locations. Some key features of MOBAs, such as control over one specific character in a party, growth in power over time, learning new thematic abilities, leveling and accumulation of experience points, usage of the mana resource, equipment and inventory management, completing quests, and fighting with powerful boss monsters, are also typical of role-playing games.

History

Origins 
The roots of the genre can be traced back decades to one of the earliest real-time strategy (RTS) titles, the 1989 Sega Mega Drive/Genesis game Herzog Zwei.
It has variously been cited either as a precursor to, or an early example of,
the MOBA genre. It used a similar formula, where each player controls a single command unit in one of two opposing sides on a battlefield. Herzog Zweis influence is apparent in several later MOBA games such as Guilty Gear 2: Overture (2007) and AirMech (2012).

In 1998, Future Cop: LAPD featured a strategic "Precinct Assault" mode similar to Herzog Zwei in which the players could actively fight alongside generated non-player units.
This could be regarded as the first example of MOBA gameplay, depending on the definition of the genre,
although Herzog Zwei was also cited as an inspiration to the developers of Warcraft and Starcraft.
The PC version of Future Cop: LAPD was a game that met the criteria of an online arena video game, unlike Herzog Zwei, as it allowed for online competitive play.

In the same year, computer game company Blizzard Entertainment released its best-selling real-time strategy game StarCraft (1998) with a suite of game editing tools called StarEdit. These tools allowed players to design and create custom maps with non-standard rules and gameplay. A modder known as Aeon64 made a custom map named Aeon of Strife (AoS) that became popular. Some of the key features introduced in AoS became the foundation of the newborn genre.
In the Aeon of Strife map, players controlled a single powerful hero unit fighting along three lanes which were protected by defensive towers. The terrain outside these lanes was nearly vacant. In early versions of the game, hero units didn't have any particular special abilities. Instead, players spent gold on weapon and armor upgrades.
It was rumored that the modder was attempting to create gameplay similar to that of Future Cop: LAPDs Precinct Assault mode.

Establishing the genre: 2000s 
In 2002, Blizzard released Warcraft III: Reign of Chaos (WC3), with the accompanying Warcraft III World Editor. Both the multiplayer online battle arena and tower defense subgenres took substantive shape within the WC3 modding community. A modder named Eul began converting Aeon of Strife into the Warcraft III engine, calling the map Defense of the Ancients (DotA). Eul substantially improved the complexity of play from the original Aeon of Strife mod. Shortly after creating the custom DotA map, Eul left the modding scene. With no clear successor, Warcraft III modders created a variety of maps based on DotA and featuring different heroes. In 2003, after the release of WarCraft III: The Frozen Throne, a map creator named Meian created a DotA variant closely modeled on Eul's map, but combining heroes from the many other versions of DotA that existed at the time. Called DotA: Allstars, it was inherited after a few months by a modder called Steve "Guinsoo" Feak, and under his guidance it became the dominant map of the genre. After more than a year of maintaining the DotA: Allstars map, with the impending release of an update that significantly changed the map layout, Guinsoo left the development to his adjutant Neichus in the year 2005. After some weeks of development and some versions released, the latter turned over responsibility to a modder named IceFrog, who initiated large changes to the mechanics that deepened its complexity and capacity for innovative gameplay. The changes conducted by IceFrog were well-received and the number of users on the Dota: Allstars forum is thought to have peaked at over one million. DotA is largely attributed to being the most significant inspiration for the multiplayer online battle arena (MOBA) video game genre in the years to come.

Mainstream popularity: 2008–present 
By 2008, the popularity of DotA had attracted commercial attention. Since the format was tied to the Warcraft property, developers began to work on their own "DOTA-style" video games. A Flash web game, named Minions, was created by The Casual Collective in 2008. Gas Powered Games released the first stand-alone commercial title in the genre, Demigod (2009). In late 2009, Riot Games' debut title League of Legends was released. It was initially designed by Steve Feak, one of the original creators of DotA: Allstars, who went on to apply many of the mechanics and lessons he learned from the mod. Riot began to refer to the game's genre as a multiplayer online battle arena (MOBA). Also in 2009, IceFrog, who had continued to develop DotA: Allstars, was hired by Valve, in order to design a sequel to the original map.

In 2010, S2 Games released Heroes of Newerth, with a large portion of its gameplay and aesthetics based on DotA: Allstars. The same year, Valve announced Dota 2 and subsequently secured the franchise's intellectual property rights after being contested by Riot Games for the DotA trademark. In 2012, Activision Blizzard settled a trademark dispute with Valve over the usage of the DOTA name and announced their own standalone game which was eventually named Heroes of the Storm. Dota 2 was released in 2013, and was referred to by Valve as an "action real-time strategy" game. In 2014, Hi-Rez Studios released Smite, a MOBA with a third-person perspective. Heroes of the Storm was released in 2015, featuring hero characters from Warcraft III and other Blizzard's franchises. Blizzard adopted their own personal dictation for their game's genre with "hero brawler", citing its focus on action.

With the expansion of the smartphone market, numerous MOBA titles have been released for portable devices, such as Vainglory (2014), and Honor of Kings (2015). An international adaptation of Honor of Kings developed by TiMi Studios and published by Tencent Games for markets outside mainland China, rebranded as Arena of Valor (2016), was released in the western market in 2017. In 2021, the Pokémon series released its first MOBA game in Pokémon Unite.

Next-generation wave and market saturation 
During the last half of the 2010s, video game developers and publishers, following the success of League of Legends and Dota 2, tried to be part of the next-generation MOBA wave by putting their own twist in the genre, releasing games such as Battlerite (2017), and AirMech (2018). After years of development, many games which were supported by large publishers have not been fully released or their servers were shut down shortly after release. The most notable examples are Dawngate (2015) by Electronic Arts, DC Comics-based Infinite Crisis (2015) by Warner Bros., Arena of Fate (2016) by Crytek, Gigantic (2017) by Perfect World Entertainment, Master X Master (2018) by NCSoft, and Paragon (2018) by Epic Games.

Impact 

In the original Defense of the Ancients (DotA), each player controls one powerful unit rather than a large army. While it still kept the large scale, core mechanics, and goals of the real-time strategy games, DotA attempted to avoid "clickfest" gameplay in which high actions per minute scores are mandatory for efficient playing, changing focus to the actual teamwork, coordination, and tactics. This made the mod highly popular, as its dynamic and unpredictable fights, complex map, and hero-centric gameplay create a more competitive environment and opportunities for outplaying the enemy team. By the early 2010s, multiplayer online battle arena has become a prominent genre in esports tournaments. The genre has seen further growth in popularity since the year 2015 – among the top five esports with the largest prize pools, three have been MOBA titles for three years in row. Distributed prize money in MOBA tournaments reached over US$54 million in 2017. A year later, prize pools continued to grow reaching over US$60 million, 40% of the year's total esports prize pools. MOBAs are some of the most watched games in the world. Major esports professional tournaments are held in venues that can hold tens of thousands of spectators and are streamed online to millions more. A strong fanbase has opened up the opportunity for sponsorship and advertising, eventually leading the genre to become a global cultural phenomenon.

A free-to-play business model, which is used by the largest MOBA titles, have contributed to the genre's overall popularity. Players are able to download and play AAA-quality games at no cost. These games are generating revenue by selling cosmetic elements, including skins, voice lines, customized mounts and announcers, but none of these give the functional gameplay advantages to the buyer. As of 2012, free-to-play MOBAs, such as League of Legends, Dota 2, Heroes of the Storm, and Smite were among the most popular PC games. The success in the genre has helped convince many video game publishers to copy the free-to-play MOBA model. SuperData Research reported that the genre generated over $2.5 billion of revenue in 2017.

Similar to fighting games, MOBAs offer a large number of viable player characters for the player to choose from, each of which having distinctive abilities, strengths, and weaknesses. With such wide varieties available, players have numerous choices from which to find the character most aligned with their skills and preferences.  Playable characters blend a variety of fantasy tropes and often feature numerous references to popular culture and mythology. One such figure commonly represented in MOBAs is Sun Wukong, a legendary mythical figure from 16th-century China. Examples of representation of Sun Wukong in MOBAs in the form of playable characters include "Wukong" in League of Legends, Samuro's "Monkey King" skin (custom outfit/costume) in Heroes of the Storm, and "Monkey King" in DotA 2.

Data analytics and match prediction
Due to the large volume of matches played on a daily basis around the world and the relatively complicated nature of the genre, MOBAs have become a popular target for the application of big data tools to predict match outcomes based on in-game factors such as hero kill/death/assist ratios, gold earned, time of a match, synergy with other players, team composition, and other, more advanced parameters.

Artificial Intelligence in MOBAs 
The use of artificial intelligence in MOBAs is an ongoing topic of research. Similar to real-time strategy games, MOBAs provide a highly complex environment for AI because of their large amount of possible variables, states, and decisions. One of the first known research-based MOBA AI agents was published around 2015 for League of Legends. The agent used influence maps to navigate the map and compute positioning risk. A similar agent to assist players was published in the same year.

Two years later, artificial intelligence research laboratory OpenAI developed the AI project OpenAI Five, which was first showcased at the Dota 2 World Championship, The International 2017, during a 1v1 demonstration. In this demonstration, OpenAI Five faced off against Dendi, one of the most prolific and popular DotA players of all time. In this 1v1, OpenAI Five defeated Dendi twice in a resounding manner, with the first victory occurring before the five-minute mark and Dendi conceding before ninety seconds had passed in the second match. Open AI returned to The International 2018, this time fielding an entire team of five AI players in two games against professional players, but ultimately losing both games. Despite this loss, OpenAI continued to work to improve OpenAI Five, and the project's advancement soon became evident: one year later, at The International 2019, OpenAI Five defeated The International 2018-winner OG, becoming the first artificial intelligence system to beat the reigning world champion team at a video game.

See also
List of multiplayer online battle arena games

Notes

References

Bibliography

External links 

 
Video game genres
Video game terminology